Gram Panchayat in present day Telangana. It is alleged that the erstwhile population that was largely Hindu left the village fearing the Mughal invasion and moved south to Tamil Nadu.Descendants of this village are now settled in Krishnagiri. 
Cheemaldari  village located in Mominpet Mandal, Vikarabad District, Telangana, India. 

Gram Panchayat Election (2013-2018): 

Sarpanch : NASANPALLI NARSIMHA REDDY 

Gram Panchayat Elections (2019-present): 

Sarpanch: NASANPALLI NARSIMHA REDDY

References

Villages in Ranga Reddy district